Russian Open School Astronomical Olympiad by Correspondence (ROSAOC) – is an annual international competition for secondary school students in astronomy. Olympiad is being conducted in one theoretical stage by correspondence. The languages of the Olympiad are English and Russian.

Russian Open School Astronomical Olympiad by Correspondence – 2008 started on December 16, 2007.  The deadline for paper submission is February, 11th 2008.

See also 
International Astronomy Olympiad

External links 
 The official website

Science competitions